The NCAA Division III Men's Outdoor Track and Field Championship are the annual collegiate outdoor track and field competitions for men organised by the National Collegiate Athletic Association. Athletes' individual performances earn points for their institution and individual national titles while the team with the most points receives the NCAA team title for outdoor track and field.

Events

Track events

 
Sprint events
100 meter dash 
200 meter dash 
400 meter dash 

Distance events
800 meter run
1,500 meter run
3,000 meter steeplechase
5,000 meter run
10,000 meter run

Hurdle Events
110 meter hurdles
400 meter intermediate hurdles

Relay events
400 meter relay
1,600 meter relay

Field events

 
Jumping events
High jump
Pole vault 
Long jump
Triple jump

Throwing events
Shot put
Discus throw
Hammer throw
Javelin throw

Multi-events
Decathlon

Discontinued events

 
Sprint events
100 yard dash 
220 yard dash 
440 yard dash 
880 yard dash 

Distance events
Mile run 
Three-mile run 
Six-mile run 

Hurdle events
120 yard high hurdles 
440 yard intermediate hurdles 

Relay events
440 yard relay 
Mile relay

Results

Scoring
 1974–1981: the top 6 finishers scored for their team, with points being awarded 10, 8, 6, 4, 2, 1
 1982–1984: the top 12 finishers scored for their team with points being awarded 15, 12, 10, 9, 8, 7, 6, 5, 4, 3, 2, 1.
 1985–present: the top 8 finishers scored, with points awarded 10, 8, 6, 5, 4, 3, 2, 1. In the place of a tie of two or more people the total points for those accumulated places are added up and divided by the number of people.

Team Champions

Champions

Team titles
List updated through 2021.

Individual titlesList updated through the 2019 Championships ''

 Schools highlight in yellow have reclassified athletics from NCAA Division III.

Event records

See also
NCAA Men's Outdoor Track and Field Championship (Division I, Division II)
NCAA Women's Outdoor Track and Field Championship (Division I, Division II, Division III)
NCAA Men's Indoor Track and Field Championship (Division I, Division II, Division III)
NCAA Women's Indoor Track and Field Championships (Division I, Division II, Division III)
NAIA Men's Outdoor Track and Field Championship
Pre-NCAA Outdoor Track and Field Champions

References

External links
NCAA Division III men's outdoor track and field

 NCAA Men's Division III
 Outdoor
Track Outdoor Men